Brad Edwards may refer to:

 Brad Edwards (American football) (born 1966), former American football defensive back
 Brad Edwards (journalist) (1947–2006), news reporter for television station KFOR-TV in Oklahoma City, Oklahoma
 Brad Edwards (Australian footballer) (born 1968), former Australian rules footballer

See also
 Bradley C. Edwards, researcher on space elevators
 Bradley Robert Edwards, accused murderer